Jan-bazan is an Iranian war film directed by Nasser Mohammadi and written by Hossein Omrani. Released in 1981, it is a very early example of Sacred Defence cinema, or cinema about the Iran-Iraq war.

References

1980s war films
Iran–Iraq War films
1980s Persian-language films
Iranian war films